Something Dirty is the 11th studio album by the German krautrock group Faust, released in 2011.

As well as Jean-Hervé Péron and Werner "Zappi" Diermaier the album features James Johnston and Geraldine Swayne.

Track listing
 "Tell the Bitch to Go Home" – 5:53	
 "Herbststimmung" – 5:37	
 "Something Dirty" – 7:13	
 "Thoughts of the Dead" – 2:10	
 "Lost the Signal" – 8:43	
 "Je Bouffe" – 1:27	
 "Whet" – 2:07	
 "Invisible Mending" – 2:16	
 "Dampfauslass 1" – 3:21	
 "Dampfauslass 2" – 2:34	
 "Pythagoras" – 2:11	
 "Save the Last One" – 0:19	
 "La Sole Dorée" – 5:16

References

External links

2011 albums
Faust (band) albums